Borpop Airfield, also known as Huris Airfield, was an aerodrome located near Namatani, west of Borpop Harbour in New Ireland Province, Papua New Guinea. The airfield was built by the Imperial Japanese during World War II.

References

External links
http://www.pacificwrecks.com/airfields/png/borpop/index.html

Transport in Papua New Guinea
Airports in Papua New Guinea
New Ireland Province